Rawayana is a Venezuelan band formed in Caracas in 2007. The group's music combines a variety of musical genres including reggae, funk, and salsa, and the members describe their style as "trippy pop". The band consists of vocalist/guitarist Alberto "Beto" Montenegro, bassist Antonio "Tony" Casas, drummer Andrés Story, and guitarist Alejandro Abeijón. 

After the release of the album Trippy Caribbean in 2016, the band was nominated for Best New Artist at the 18th Annual Latin Grammy Awards, losing to Dominican musician Vicente García. Rawayana's 2021 album Cuando los Acéfalos Predominan discusses the crisis in Venezuela in both its lyrical content as well as the album's accompanying music videos. The album featured Los Amigos Invisibles, Cheo Pardo, and Akapellah, and was released in conjunction with an art installation in Mexico City.

Members
 Alberto "Beto" Montenegro (vocals, guitar)
 Antonio "Tony" Casas (bass)
 Andrés "Fofo" Story (drums)
 Alejandro "Abeja" Abeijón (guitar)

Discography
 Licencia para ser libre (2011)
 Rawayanaland (2013)
 Trippy Caribbean (2016)
 Cuando los Acéfalos Predominan (2021)

References

Venezuelan musical groups
Political music groups
Musical groups established in 2007